Todd Dunivant (born December 26, 1980) is an American former soccer player who played 13 years in Major League Soccer winning 5 MLS Cup trophies. After retirement he spearheaded the San Francisco Deltas professional soccer team as the Director of Soccer Operations and Business Development —winning the NASL Championship in its expansion season. He currently serves as the general manager of Sacramento Republic FC.

Career

College and amateur
In high school, Dunivant won two Colorado state championships in 1997 and 1998 at Dakota Ridge High School. Dunivant was also an exemplary 
student, being Valedictorian for his class of 1999.
Dunivant played college soccer at Stanford University from 1999 to 2002. Dunivant appeared in 81 Games at Stanford and was the only player in the nation to be both First Team All-American and First Team Academic All-American in 2002. He led the Cardinal to back to back Final Fours in 2001 and 2002. He graduated with a Bachelor of Arts in Economics in 3.33 years.

Playing career 
Dunivant was the first college senior taken in the 2003 MLS SuperDraft and was selected sixth overall by the San Jose Earthquakes. Dunivant started all thirty of the team's games that year, while scoring one goal and six assists, as the Quakes won its second MLS Cup. He was traded to Los Angeles Galaxy in 2005 in a four-player deal and played every minute for the Galaxy, as they won the MLS Cup and U.S. Open Cup double.[1] Dunivant was eventually traded to the New York Red Bulls, where he made twenty-two appearances during the 2006-07 seasons.

Dunivant was acquired by expansion side Toronto FC on June 27, 2007, in a trade for Kevin Goldthwaite. Dunivant played 18 games for Toronto in his first season, all of them starts. Dunivant was traded back to the Los Angeles Galaxy on February 3, 2009, in exchange for allocation money. He spent seven more seasons with the Galaxy, collecting 3 more MLS Cups (2011, 2012, 2014), 2 supporter shields (2010, 2011).

Dunivant retired from soccer at the end of the 2015 MLS season with 25 MLS Playoff appearances, 5 MLS Cup Championships (second most all-time), a 2011 Best XI Selection and a 4x Humanitarian of the Year Recipient.[2] Those accomplishments suggest that Dunivant "was arguably the best left fullback in the league during his career - certainly one of the most consistent players in MLS."

Dunivant got his first cap for the United States national team on January 29, 2006, against Norway where he recorded 2 assists. He then started in a 3–2 victory over Japan on February 11, 2006.

Honors

Club
LA Galaxy
 Major League Soccer MLS Cup: 2005, 2011, 2012, 2014
 Lamar Hunt U.S. Open Cup: 2005
 Major League Soccer Supporter's Shield: 2010, 2011
 Major League Soccer Western Conference Championship: 2005, 2009, 2011

San Jose Earthquakes
 Major League Soccer MLS Cup: 2003

Individual
 Major League Soccer MLS Best XI: 2011

References

External links
 

1980 births
Living people
All-American men's college soccer players
American expatriate soccer players
American expatriate sportspeople in Canada
American soccer players
Association football defenders
Colorado Rapids U-23 players
Expatriate soccer players in Canada
LA Galaxy players
LA Galaxy II players
Major League Soccer players
New York Red Bulls players
People from Wheat Ridge, Colorado
San Jose Earthquakes draft picks
San Jose Earthquakes players
Soccer players from Colorado
Stanford Cardinal men's soccer players
Toronto FC players
United States men's international soccer players
USL Championship players
USL League Two players